La Combattante ("The Combatant") was a destroyer of the Forces navales françaises libres (FNFL). A British-built , she was offered to the Free French in 1942.

History
Laid down as HMS Haldon, she was damaged in a bombing in the night of 14 March 1941. She was offered to the FNFL in 1942, and renamed La Combattante.

Escort duty and S-Boot fighting
La Combattante made her first sortie in 23 March 1943, escorting a convoy in the English Channel. She rescued 68 sailors from the liberty ship Stell Traveller, after it had struck a mine.

On 29 May 1943, she rescued British and Australian aircrews ; in September 1943, she rescued two British airmen.

In the night of 25–26 April 1944, La Combattante and the frigate  intercepted a group of German E-boats; La Combattante managed to sink S-147 and damage another ship. In the night of 12–13 May, La Combattante destroyed S-141, killing Klaus Dönitz, Admiral Dönitz's son in the process.

During the night of 27–28 May La Combattante met motor torpedo boats MTB-732 and MTB-739; the two groups mistakenly engaged each other, and MTB-732 was sunk.

D-Day
Under commandant André Patou, La Combattante took part in Operation Neptune, providing close fire support to the landing parties during the Battle of Normandy off Courseulles-sur-Mer. La Combattante destroyed several shore batteries, until troops started landing on the beach. She then returned to Portsmouth, escorting a landing ship dock.

On 25 June 1944 La Combattante rescued two downed US pilots.

Ferrying General De Gaulle
La Combattante kept escorting convoys in the Channel between France and England until 14 July 1944, when she was ordered to the King's Stairs of Portsmouth harbour; awaiting the ship's arrival were General Charles de Gaulle, Generals Béthouart and Koenig, Admiral d'Argenlieu, Gaston Palewski, Pierre Viénot, Pierre Billotte, François Coulet, Pierre de Chevigné, Geoffroy de Courcel, Pierre Laroque and Claude Hettier de Boislambert, preparing to cross the English Channel to Normandy
The delegation also carried a 250-million franc treasure to counter introduction of the US occupation franc. One of the most famous photographs of De Gaulle was taken aboard during the journey, before he landed at Courseulles.

Fights off Normandy
La Combattante further patrolled the Channel. In the night of 25–26 August 1944, she sank four German ships ferrying an artillery unit.

On 23 February 1945, an explosion broke La Combattante in two and she sank quickly, with 117 survivors of her 181-man crew. Allied sources stated the ship having been sunk whilst running on a mine. Sparbrodt was decorated for his alleged success. The ship sunk by Sparbrodt was in fact the British cable layer .

Notes and references

Publications
 
 English, John (1987). The Hunts: a history of the design, development and careers of the 86 destroyers of this class built for the Royal and Allied Navies during World War II. England: World Ship Society. .

External links
 LA COMBATTANTE
 netmarine.net

 

Hunt-class destroyers of the Free French Naval Forces
Hunt-class destroyers of the Royal Navy
1942 ships
Maritime incidents in February 1945
Naval ships of Operation Neptune
Ships built on the River Clyde
Ships sunk by mines
World War II destroyers of the United Kingdom
World War II destroyers of France
World War II shipwrecks in the English Channel